Joacim Cans (born 19 February 1970 in Mora) is a Swedish singer, best known as the lead vocalist of heavy metal band HammerFall. He is the only member aside from founder and guitarist Oscar Dronjak to appear on all of the band's albums.

Cans attended the Musicians Institute in Hollywood, California.

He released his first solo album titled Beyond the Gates in 2004.

Cans participated with a choir team in the Swedish television program Körslaget (the Swedish version of Clash of the Choirs) in 2008. On 10 May his team won the competition.

Bands 
Line-up
Joacim Cans – vocals
Oscar Dronjak – lead and rhythm guitars
Pontus Norgren – lead and rhythm guitars
Fredrik Larsson – bass and backing vocals
David Wallin – drums

Current bands
HammerFall
Cans

Past bands
Lost Horizon
Warlord
Mrs Hippie

Discography

Solo albums

References

External links 

HammerFall's official site
HammerFall's official fan club
Interview with Joacim Cans , Metal Express Radio, 2006

1970 births
Swedish heavy metal singers
English-language singers from Sweden
Living people
Musicians Institute alumni
21st-century Swedish singers
21st-century Swedish male singers
HammerFall members
Warlord (band) members
Columbia Records artists
Melodifestivalen contestants of 2013